is a Japanese volleyball competition that was established in 2007. It is organized by the Japan Volleyball Association.

The word Tennō (天皇) means the Emperor of Japan, and the term Kōgō (皇后) is the Empress of Japan. The Tennō Kōgō Commemorative Cup is given to the champion of the tournament. The Commemorative Cup was given to the winner of the Kurowashiki All Japan Volleyball Championship until 2006.

Champions

MVP by edition 
From the 2021 edition, the MVP Award has been created. The prize money for the MVP award is JP¥100,000.

Prize money
 The winner: JP¥10,000,000
 Runner-up: JP¥4,000,000.

Capcom Award

As Capcom signed 3 year partnership contract with JVA, Capcom Award was established for the winner. Another ten million Japan Yen (JP¥10,000,000) per gender will be given for three consecutive years starting in 2022. It makes the Emperor's Cup and Empress' Cup All Japan Volleyball Championship become the highest endowed tournament in Japan.

References 

Volleyball competitions in Japan
Recurring sporting events established in 2007